Antonio Susini (1901 – death date unknown) was a Cuban shortstop in the Negro leagues and Cuban League. 

A native of Havana, Cuba, Susini played for Almendares in the Cuban League in 1918–1919, and went on to play for the All Cubans in 1921. He killed Jose Leblanc after hitting him on the head with a bat.

References

External links
  and Seamheads
 Antonio Susini at Negro League Baseball Players Association

1901 births
Date of birth missing
Year of death missing
Place of death missing
All Cubans players
Almendares (baseball) players
Baseball infielders
Cuban murderers